William Sidney Collins Jr. (23 December 1912 – 2 January 1983) was an English professional golfer. He won the Welsh Professional Championship in 1938 and 1952, and the 1954 Goodwin (Sheffield) Foursomes Tournament, partnered by Bernard Hunt.

Early life
Collins was born in the Northwich, Cheshire in late 1912. His father was the professional at Mid Cheshire Golf Club at the time.

Golf career
After leaving school Collins was an assistant to his father at Sandiway Golf Club before becoming an assistant to his great-uncle Fred Collins at Llandudno. He later became the professional at Llandudno after Fred's retirement.

Collins won the 1938 Welsh Professional Championship at St Mellons, his first appearance in the event. He scored 291 for the 72 holes, to win by 5 strokes from the holder and local professional, Frank Hill and Gwyn James of Newport.

Collins won the Welsh Professional Championship for a second time in 1950 at Southerndown. His score of 301 was 3 ahead of defending champion Harry Gould and R Jenkins.

Partnered by Bernard Hunt, Collins won the 1954 Goodwin (Sheffield) Foursomes Tournament at Rotherham Golf Club, beating John Fallon and Wally Smithers in the final. The match was level after 33 holes but a birdie 2 at the 34th and a par 4 at the 35th gave Collins and Hunt a 2&1 victory.

Death
Collins died on 2 January 1983 in London, although his home address was in Llandudno.

Professional wins (2)
1938 Welsh Professional Championship
1952 Welsh Professional Championship
1954 Goodwin (Sheffield) Foursomes Tournament (with Bernard Hunt)

Results in major championships

Note: Collins only played in The Open Championship.

NT = No tournament
CUT = missed the half-way cut
"T" indicates a tie for a place

References

English male golfers
Sportspeople from Northwich
1912 births
1983 deaths